Thomas Hadden Humphreys (September 20, 1865 – November 7, 1951) was an American politician. He was a member of the Arkansas House of Representatives, serving from 1899 to 1903. He was a member of the Democratic party.

References

1951 deaths
1865 births
19th-century American politicians
20th-century American politicians
Speakers of the Arkansas House of Representatives
Democratic Party members of the Arkansas House of Representatives